The 1998 IIHF World Championship was held in Switzerland from 1–17 May 1998.  The format expanded to 16 teams for the first time.  The teams were divided into four groups of four with the top two teams in each advancing to the next round.  The two groups of four then played a round robin with the top two teams in each moving on to the semi-finals.  The semi-finals were a two-game total goals for series as was the final.

Venues

Qualifying Round (Austria) 
Played 6–9 November 1997 in Klagenfurt.  The Kazakhs, Austrians, and Norwegians finished virtually even.  In head-to-head match-ups they each had one win and one loss, they each had scored as many as they had allowed.  The Kazakhs scored six goals, the other two both five, pushing them to first.  The Norwegians had beaten Poland by three, on the final day the Austrians pushed their advantage over Poland to four, giving them the final spot in the World Championship.

Kazakhstan and Austria advanced to Group A, Norway and Poland competed in Group B.

First round
In each group, the top two nations advanced to the next round.  Third place teams played a final round against each other to determine who escaped having to qualify for next year's tournament.  Fourth place teams did not play further, they were automatically entered in qualifiers for next year's tournament.  The highlight of the round was the French victory of the US, the first ever in an official match.

Group 1 

Japan was relegated to the qualifiers for the 1999 IIHF World Championship.

Group 2 

Austria was relegated to the qualifiers for the 1999 IIHF World Championship.

Group 3 

France was relegated to the qualifiers for the 1999 IIHF World Championship.

Group 4 

Kazakhstan was relegated to the qualifiers for the 1999 IIHF World Championship.

Consolation Round 9-12 Place 

Germany and the United States were relegated to the qualifiers for the 1999 IIHF World Championship.

Second round
Group 2 and 3 first place teams played against group 1 and 4 second place teams in group 5, group 1 and 4 first place teams played against group 2 and 3 second place teams.  The top two, from each group, advanced to the semi-finals.

Group 5

Group 6

Final round

Bracket

Semifinals

Match for third place

Final

Ranking and statistics

Tournament Awards
Best players selected by the directorate:
Best Goaltender:       Ari Sulander
Best Defenceman:       František Kučera
Best Forward:          Peter Forsberg
Media All-Star Team:
Goaltender:  Tommy Salo
Defence:  Jere Karalahti,  František Kučera
Forwards:  Peter Forsberg,  Ville Peltonen,  Mats Sundin

Final standings
The final standings of the tournament according to IIHF:

Places eleven through sixteen were not relegated but had to play in qualifying tournaments for inclusion in the 1999 championship.

Scoring leaders
List shows the top skaters sorted by points, then goals.
Source: quanthockey.com

Leading goaltenders
Only the top five goaltenders, based on save percentage, who have played 40% of their team's minutes are included in this list.
Source: quanthockey.com

See also
1998 World Junior Ice Hockey Championships

Citations

References
Complete results

Archive Switzerland 1998
Qualifying tournament details

 
IIHF World Championship
Men's World Ice Hockey Championships
1
World
1998
May 1998 sports events in Europe
Sports competitions in Zürich
Sports competitions in Basel
20th century in Zürich
20th century in Basel